The following is a list of people executed by the U.S. state of Nevada.


Between 1861 and 1903

Between late 1861, when Nevada Territory was organized, and 1903, executions by hanging were conducted at the county seats in which the person was convicted.

There has not been a definitive compilation of legal executions conducted in Nevada prior to 1903, however there are 20 known legal executions between 1861 and 1903:

1903–1921: People executed at the state capital

The 1901 state legislature required that all executions be conducted at the State Prison in Carson City beginning in 1903.

The 1911 state legislature provided that a death row inmate could elect to die by shooting or hanging.

1921–1976: Nevada State Prison gas chamber

Prior to January 1, 1912 the law prescribed hanging as the means of carrying out the death sentence in the State of Nevada, however, upon revision of the statutes in 1911 the condemned were allowed a choice between the gallows and the firing squad. This remained the law until March 28, 1921 when an amendment was adopted providing for execution by means of lethal gas. Nevada was the first state to sanction the use of the gas chamber.

The first execution by use of lethal gas took place in February 1924 and has been used as the means of carrying out the death sentence a total of thirty-one times. The last execution was held October 22, 1979.

After 1976

A total of 12 people convicted of murder have been executed by the state of Nevada since 1976. The first execution was carried out by gas chamber; subsequent executions were carried out by lethal injection. All but one (Richard Allen Moran) waived their appeals and asked that the execution be carried out.

See also 
 Capital punishment in Nevada
 Capital punishment in the United States

References 

People executed by Nevada
Nevada
People executed
Executions